Eduardo Jorge "Anjinho" Bacil Filho (born March 11, 1971) is a Brazilian professional volleyball and beach volleyball player.

Biography
He was the first Brazilian and the first foreign player ever to win an Association of Volleyball Professionals tournament in America. Fellow AVP alumni Stein Metzger has given Bacil the credit for inventing the "Steino" Pokey shot. In 2011, he Earned his first outdoor domestic title at the Huntington Beach open with Scott Ayakatubby, and in 1995, he won his first AVP title with José Loiola indoors at Washington, D.C. Anjinho Bacil was a two-time Brazilian Beach Volleyball Champion in both 1991 and 1992, and he also won the South American Beach Volleyball Championship in 1993. He played professionally on the Brazilian indoor volleyball team from 1986–1992.

Eduardo Jorge Bacil Filho is his full name, but his nickname is "Anjinho", which is Portuguese for "little angel".  He is from Copacabana Beach, Rio de Janeiro, Brazil, Bacil currently resides in Redondo Beach, CA and has four children.

References

External links
 

1971 births
Living people
Brazilian men's volleyball players
American men's volleyball players
Brazilian men's beach volleyball players
Sportspeople from Redondo Beach, California
Volleyball players from Rio de Janeiro (city)